Paul Butcher may refer to:
Paul Butcher (American football) (born 1963), American football linebacker
Paul Butcher (actor) (born 1994), American actor; son of Paul Butcher Sr.